"Mr. Mom" is a song written by Ron Harbin, Richie McDonald and Don Pfrimmer, and recorded by American country music band Lonestar. It was released in July 2004 as the second single from their fifth studio album Let's Be Us Again. The song reached the top of the Billboard Hot Country Singles & Tracks chart on November 20, and is their last number one hit to date.

Content 
The song is a moderate uptempo number in which the lead singer describes his attempts to be "Mr. Mom" — i.e., a stay-at-home father attempting to raise his children while his wife is at work.

Music video 
The music video is a cartoon set in Nashville portraying a baby and a couple of kids, and features scenes in sync with the lyrics. When the kids' mother comes back home from work, she finds her husband tied up by the kids. Angered, she sends them (including the baby) upstairs. After the song ends, the father brings a diaper to an outside trash can, as a bus with the band’s name drives by with the baby on board, turning the background into live action, but still leaving the characters as a cartoon. Shocked, the father screams as the video fades out. The music video was directed by Roman White and Revolution Pictures.

Chart performance
"Mr. Mom" debuted at number 46 on the Hot Country Songs chart dated July 24, 2004. It charted for 28 weeks on that chart, and reached Number One on the chart dated November 20, 2004, and stayed there for two weeks.

Year-end charts

Certifications

References

2004 singles
Lonestar songs
Song recordings produced by Dann Huff
Music videos directed by Roman White
Songs written by Richie McDonald
BNA Records singles
Songs written by Ron Harbin
Songs written by Don Pfrimmer
2004 songs
Animated music videos